Ancylolomia gracilis is a moth in the family Crambidae. It was described by James Farish Malcolm Fawcett in 1918. It is found in the Democratic Republic of the Congo, Ethiopia, Kenya and Rwanda.

Subspecies
Ancylolomia gracilis gracilis
Ancylolomia gracilis stenochtha Meyrick, 1934 (Democratic Republic of the Congo)

References

Ancylolomia
Moths described in 1918
Moths of Africa